Steven Kleynen (born 22 December 1977) is a Belgian former cyclist.

Major results

1999
 9th Under-23 World Road Race Championships
2000
 1st Stage 2 Tour of Bohemia
2001
 6th GP du canton d'Argovie
 7th Grand Prix de Wallonie
2003
 1st Overall Circuito Montañés
2005
 7th Hel van het Mergelland
 8th Clásica de Almería
 9th Overall Sachsen-Tour
2006
 7th Hel van het Mergelland
 8th Overall Rheinland-Pfalz Rundfahrt

Grand Tour general classification results timeline

References

1977 births
Living people
Belgian male cyclists
Sportspeople from Leuven
Cyclists from Flemish Brabant